Gurimu Narita (成田 緑夢, Narita Gurimu, born 1 February 1994) is a Japanese disabled snowboarder. He won gold in Snowboarding at the 2018 Winter Paralympics – Men's banked slalom in the SB-LL2 classification and bronze in Snowboarding at the 2018 Winter Paralympics – Men's snowboard cross.

References

External links 
 
 Gurimu Narita at World Para Snowboard

1994 births
Living people
Japanese male snowboarders
Paralympic snowboarders of Japan
Paralympic medalists in snowboarding
Paralympic gold medalists for Japan
Paralympic bronze medalists for Japan
Snowboarders at the 2018 Winter Paralympics
Medalists at the 2018 Winter Paralympics
21st-century Japanese people